Matthew Leland Skrmetta (born November 6, 1972) is a former American professional baseball pitcher. He played during one season in Major League Baseball (MLB) with the Montreal Expos and Pittsburgh Pirates in 2000. He also played two seasons in the Nippon Professional Baseball (NPB), 2003 for the Fukuoka Daiei Hawks and 2005 for the Tohoku Rakuten Golden Eagles. He holds the record for playing for the most professional teams, with 25.

Amateur career 
He graduated from Satellite High School in 1990. He led Satellite to the 1990 Class 3A State Championship baseball game where they lost to Pace High School 13-3.

Professional career 
Skrmetta was drafted by the Detroit Tigers in the 26th round of the 1993 amateur draft.

In 2002, Skrmetta was 8-0 with one save, 58 strikeouts in 61 innings pitched for a 2.51 ERA while pitching for the Omaha Royals, the Kansas City Royals' Triple-A affiliate.

Skrmetta broke former major league baseball pitcher Mike Morgan's record when he played with the Chicago White Sox Triple-A affiliate Charlotte Knights in 2006. Skrmetta played for a record 25 professional teams and in 13 organizations. In 2007, he played for his 25th and last professional team, the Road Warriors of the independent Atlantic League.

References

External links

1972 births
Living people
American expatriate baseball players in Canada
American expatriate baseball players in Japan
Atlantic League Road Warriors players
Baseball players from Mississippi
Brevard County Manatees players
Bristol Tigers players
Charlotte Knights players
Fayetteville Generals players
Fukuoka Daiei Hawks players
Gulf Coast Expos players
Harrisburg Senators players
Indian River State Pioneers baseball players
Jacksonville Dolphins baseball players
Jacksonville Suns players
Jamestown Jammers players
Lakeland Tigers players
Las Vegas 51s players
Las Vegas Stars (baseball) players
Louisville RiverBats players
Major League Baseball pitchers
Mobile BayBears players
Montreal Expos players
Nashville Sounds players
Nippon Professional Baseball pitchers
Omaha Royals players
Ottawa Lynx players
Pittsburgh Pirates players
Rancho Cucamonga Quakes players
Satellite High School alumni
Sportspeople from Biloxi, Mississippi
Tohoku Rakuten Golden Eagles players